Castle series may refer to:

 Castle series stamps, two definitive stamp series issued in the United Kingdom
 Castle (TV series), an American comedy-drama television series
 The Castle (radio series), a BBC radio comedy programme
 The Castle Series, a trilogy of novels consisting of Howl's Moving Castle, Castle in the Air and House of Many Ways

See also
Castle-class (disambiguation)